Looper is a Dutch surname which literally means "runner". Notable people with this name include:
 Aaron Looper (born 1976), American baseball relief pitcher
 Anita Looper (also Antje Looper, born 1975), Dutch long distance runner, see List of 5000 metres national champions
 Braden Looper (born 1974), American baseball pitcher
 Byron Looper (1964–2013), American politician and murderer
 Henk de Looper (1912–2006), Dutch field hockey player
 Jan de Looper (1914–1987), Dutch field hockey player who competed in the 1936 Summer Olympics
 Marsha Looper (born 1959), Colorado legislator
 Willem De Looper (1932–2009), American-Dutch abstract artist and chief curator at the Phillips Collection

References

Occupational surnames
Dutch-language surnames